Dishwashing, washing the dishes, doing the dishes, or washing up in Great Britain, is the process of cleaning cooking utensils, dishes, cutlery and other items to prevent foodborne illness. This is either achieved by hand in a sink using dishwashing detergent or by using a dishwasher and may take place in a kitchen, utility room, scullery or elsewhere. There are cultural divisions over rinsing and drying after washing.

Implements

Dish washing is usually done using an implement for the washer to wield, unless done using an automated dishwasher. Commonly used implements include cloths, sponges, brushes or even steel wool. As fingernails are often more effective than soft implements like cloths at dislodging hard particles, washing simply with the hands is also done and can be effective as well. Dishwashing detergent is also generally used, but bar soap can be used acceptably, as well. Rubber gloves are often worn when washing dishes by people who are sensitive to hot water or dish-washing liquids, those who do not want to touch the old food particles, or those who do not wish to get as wet. According to dermatologists, the use of protective gloves is highly recommended whenever working with water and cleaning products, since some chemicals may damage the skin, or allergies may develop in some individuals. Many people also wear aprons.

There is also variation in the temperature and state of water. Some people prefer cold water or hot water, and some people prefer running water or standing water.

Sanitization
Where dishes are to be shared among many, such as in restaurants, sanitization is necessary and desirable in order to prevent spread of microorganisms. Most restaurants have three-compartment sinks (depending on country or state regulations) and use the three-sink system (washing, rinsing and sanitizing of dirty dishes) with the first compartment containing a combination of warm water and soap or detergent.

Most institutions have a dish-washing machine which sanitizes dishes by a final rinse in either very hot water or a chemical sanitizing solution such as dilute bleach solution (50-100 parts per million chlorine; about 2 ml of 5% bleach per litre of water, approximately one capful of bleach per gallon water). Dishes are placed on large trays and fed onto rollers through the machine. Dishwashers typically exceed  and kill all germs, while hand-washing reaches temperatures of at most .

While not environmentally friendly, the use of bleach is critical to sanitation when large groups are involved: it evaporates completely, it is cheap, and it kills most germs. Cabinets, refrigerators, countertops, and anything else touched by people in a large group setting should be periodically wiped or sprayed with a dilute bleach solution after being washed with soapy water and rinsed in clean water.

However, bleach is less effective in the presence of organic debris, so a small amount of food residue can be enough to permit survival of, e.g., Salmonella bacteria. Scrubbing followed by soaking in bleach is effective at reducing Salmonella contamination, but even this method does not eliminate Salmonella bacteria.

In hand-washing, plastic brushes with nylon bristles are preferred to washcloths or sponges, which can spread microorganisms. Use of soap or sanitizer is mandatory in washing by hand in public food facilities.

Traditional dishwashing practice

Developing countries

Traditionally, dishwashing is done by scrubbing the utensils with wet fabric dipped in scrub ash to scrub away the dirt. The utensils are then rinsed in clean water and hung to drip dry. Scrub ash (kharani) is specially made by burning wood for dishwashing. This is a common practice in villages of Asian developing countries like Nepal, Indonesia, and India.

Dishwasher

A dishwasher is a machine for cleaning dishware and cutlery automatically.

A mix of water and dishwasher detergent is pumped to one or more rotating spray arms, blasting the dishes with the cleaning mixture. The mixture is recirculated to save water and energy. Often there is a pre-rinse, which may or may not include detergent, and the water is then drained. This is followed by the main wash with fresh water and detergent. Once the wash is finished, the water is drained, more hot water enters the tub by means of an electro-mechanical solenoid valve, and the rinse cycle(s) begin. After rinsing finishes the water is drained again, the dishes are dried using one of several drying methods. Typically a rinse-aid, a chemical to reduce surface tension of the water, is used to reduce water spots from hard water or other reasons.

In addition to domestic units, industrial dishwashers are available for use in commercial establishments such as hotels and restaurants, where many dishes must be cleaned.

In popular culture
 Dishwasher Pete, or Pete Jordan, is a fanzine author whose goal was to wash dishes in every state in the United States.
 The Dishwasher: Dead Samurai is an Xbox Live Arcade game in which the protagonist is an undead dishwasher.
 Dishdogz is a 2005 film about a boy working as a dishwasher during his summer break.
 In his book Down and Out in Paris and London by George Orwell, he describes his experience working as a dishwasher or plongeur in a French hotel in 1929. He describes the job, the interactions with other employees, and his thoughts on the place of a plongeur in society.
 There is a Western cultural cliché that restaurant patrons who can't pay the tab would instead work off their debt by washing dishes.

References

 
Hygiene
Articles containing video clips